This page lists only acting roles and other projects undertaken in film, television and theater in the post-Idol career of American Idol contestants. It does not include guest musical performances or interviews on TV shows, or any pre-Idol work.  It is also not intended to be a comprehensive list of all acting roles, appearances, awards nominated or won by any particular alum.  Where there are multiple entries, only the more significant may be listed. Please see the appropriate links and references for individual alum for such more complete lists.

Season 1
The first season of American Idol saw its first and only attempt at expanding the Idol franchise into the film industry.  The winner Kelly Clarkson and runner-up Justin Guarini played the leads in the musical comedy, From Justin to Kelly, but the film failed both critically and at the box office.  No further film venture had been attempted in following seasons.

Kelly Clarkson has gone on to be a coach on The Voice, voiced characters in three animated movies, and since 2019 has hosted The Kelly Clarkson Show. Justin Guarini has starred in several musical productions, including non-musical production of Shakespeare's Romeo & Juliet as Paris in 2013.  He was the host of Idol Tonight and Idol Wrap on TVGN. Tamyra Gray has starred in several musical products including Rent in 2008. Jim Verraros has starred in a number of gay-theme films, while semi-finalist Kristin Holt has forged a career as TV show host.

Season 2
The winner of season 2, Ruben Studdard, teamed up with the fifth-place finisher Trenyce and the disqualified semi-finalist Frenchie Davis to star in the touring production of Ain't Misbehavin', the recording of which won a Grammy nomination.  The runner-up Clay Aiken enjoyed two successful stints in Broadway in the musical Spamalot. Frenchie Davis also had some success in Broadway, as did Hollywood round auditioner Josh Strickland who starred as Tarzan in musical of the same name.

Kimberley Locke and Kimberly Caldwell have both pursued a career as TV hosts aside from their music.

{| class="wikitable"
|-
!Idol Contestant
!Film
!Television
!Theater
|-
| Ruben Studdard(Winner)
| 
 Lifted  (2010)as Pastor Johnson
|
 All of Us  (2005)as grown Bobby
 The Biggest Loser  (2013)contestant
|
 Ain't Misbehavin'  (2008, national tour)as Fats WallerNominated -  Best Musical Show Album (Grammy)
|-
| Clay Aiken(Runner-up)
|
|
 Scrubs (2005)as Kenny (Season 4, episode 17)
 30 Rock (2009)as himself (Season 3, episode 22)
 Phineas and Ferb (2010)as himself (voice)
 Drop Dead Diva (2011)as Tyler Callahan 
 Celebrity Apprentice (2012)Candidate
 Law & Order: Special Victims Unit (2013)as himself (Season 15, Episode 7)
| 
 Spamalot (2008–2009, Broadway)as Sir Robin
 Joseph and the Amazing Technicolor Dreamcoat (2013, regional)as Joseph
|-
|Kimberley Locke(3rd place)
|
|
 Little Talent Show (2006)Host
 Gospel Dream (2009)Host
 Rick & Steve: The Happiest Gay Couple in All the World (2009)as Steamroom Sally (voice)
|
|-
|Josh Gracin(4th place)
|
| 
 The Young and the Restless (2006)as Jake
|
|-
| Trenyce(5th place)
|
 Friends & Lovers: The Ski Trip 2 (2008)as Unique
|
| 
 Dreamgirls (2006, regional)as Deena Jones
 Love in the Nick of Tyme (2007, national tour)as Portia
 Ain't Misbehavin''' (2008, national tour)as CharlaineNominated -  Best Musical Show Album (Grammy)
 Thriller – Live (2010–2011, London, European tour)Vocalist
|-
|Carmen Rasmusen(6th place)
|
 Pride & Prejudice (2003)as Charlotte Lucas
 Racing Ace (2005)as Marilyn
|
 Fear Factor (2006)Contestant
|
|-
| Kimberly Caldwell(7th place)
|
 Wrong Turn 2: Dead End (2007)as Kimberly Caldwell
 Deception (2012)as Paige Matthews
|
 Life on a Stick (2005)as Kimberly
 Idol Tonight and Idol Wrap (2007–2009)Host
 P. Diddy's Starmaker (2009)Host
 Rock 'n Roll Fantasy Camp (2011)Host
 Best Ink (2012)Host
| 
|-
| Rickey Smith(8th place)
| 
|
|
 OZ, the Musical (2009, national tour)as Tinman
|-
|Corey Clark(9th, disqualified)
|
|
 Primetime Live (2005)as himself
|
|-
| Vanessa Olivarez(12th place)
|
|
| 
 Hairspray (2005, Toronto)as Tracy TurnbladNominated - Outstanding Performance by a Female in a Principal Role - Musical (Dora Award)
|-
| Frenchie DavisIBDB - Frenchie Davis(Semi-finalist)
|
 We Are Family (2011)as JoJoDean
 Dumbbells (2012)
| 
 The Voice (2011)Contestant
| 
 Rent (2003–2007, Broadway)as Mrs Jefferson and others
 Ain’t Misbehavin' (2008, national)Nominated -  Best Musical Show Album (Grammy)
|-
| Ashley Hartman(Semi-finalist)
|  
 Abominable  (2006)as Karen Herdberger
| 
 The O.C.  (2003–2007)as Holly Fischer (9 episodes)
 Victoria Secret TV  (2008)Host
 The Grammy's Style Studio  (2009–2010)Host
|
|}

Season 3
Season 3 winner Fantasia enjoyed a critically and commercially successful stint in musical theater when she starred in The Color Purple.  She also had her own TV show and is expanding into film.  The runner-up Diana DeGarmo also found success in musical theater  starring in Broadway musicals such as Hair and Hairspray.

Seventh-place finisher, Jennifer Hudson, became one of the most successful contests to have emerged from American Idol when she landed a part in the film adaptation of the musical Dreamgirls, and subsequently won a number of major awards as supporting actress including an Oscar.  She has since also starred in a number of major films, including Sex and the City and Sing. Eleventh-place finisher Matthew Rogers has a steady career as a TV show host. Alan Ritchson who was heavily featured in the audition and Hollywood rounds pursued a career as a TV and film actor, while auditioner William Hung briefly landed some acting roles due to his exposure on the show.

Season 4
A number of season 4 Idol alumni such as Anthony Fedorov have been involved in musical theater, but the most successful is the sixth-place finisher Constantine Maroulis.  Maroulis has been active on Broadway and was nominated for a Tony Award for his role in Rock of Ages.  The winner Carrie Underwood made her acting debut in a film by starring in Soul Surfer.

Season 5
The season 5 runner-up Katharine McPhee has established a career as a film and TV actress, and starred in the TV series Smash and Scorpion.  Eleventh-placed finisher Kevin Covais also has a steady career as an actor with many acting roles in film and TV.  Other Season 5 contestants who also pursued an acting career include Lisa Tucker.  The winner Taylor Hicks had enjoyed a stint in theater, while seventh-place finisher Ace Young also had had a couple of major acting roles in Broadway.

Season 6
The winner Jordin Sparks has taken roles both in theater and film.  She appeared opposite Whitney Houston in the film Sparkle''.  Semifinalist Jared Cotter has worked as a host for a number of TV shows.

Season 7

Season 8

Season 9

Season 10

Season 11

Season 12

Season 16

References

External links 
 IMDb
 IBDB
 Broadwayworld.com

American Idol